The Sullana Province is a landlocked province in the Piura Region in northwestern Peru. It is the northernmost province in the Piura Region.

Boundaries 
North Contralmirante Villar Province (Tumbes Region)
East Ecuador, Ayabaca Province
South Piura Province
West Paita Province, Talara Province

Political division 

Sullana - part of the Metropolitan Region of Sullana
Bellavista - part of the Metropolitan Region of Sullana
Marcavelica - part of the Metropolitan Region of Sullana
Miguel Checa
Ignacio Escudero
Lancones
Querecotillo
Salitral

Population 
The province has an approximate population of 250,000 residents.

Capital 
The capital of the province is the city of Sullana which is the second largest city in the Piura Region.

See also 
Piura Region
Peru

External links 
  SullanaOnline

Provinces of the Piura Region